Stanton is a civil parish in the district of East Staffordshire, Staffordshire, England.  The parish contains 18 listed buildings that are recorded in the National Heritage List for England.  All the listed buildings are designated at Grade II, the lowest of the three grades, which is applied to "buildings of national importance and special interest".  The parish contains the village of Stanton and the surrounding countryside.  Most of the listed buildings are in the village, and consist of a church and a chapel, and associated structures, a school, farmhouses, farm buildings, and cottages.  The listed buildings outside the village are a cross base and shaft, and a milepost.


Buildings

Notes and references

Notes

Citations

Sources

Lists of listed buildings in Staffordshire